Vandegrift may refer to:

People
Alexander Vandegrift (1887–1973), United States Marine Corps Commandant and general
Margaret Vandegrift or Margaret Thomson Janvier (1844–1913), American writer
Van Vandegrift (born 1969), American businessman

Other
, United States Navy Oliver Hazard Perry-class frigate
Vandegrift High School, high school in Austin, Texas, United States

See also
Vandergrift (disambiguation)